Natalie Masters (born Natalie Parks; November 23, 1915 – February 9, 1986) was an American actress. She was featured in several television shows, including The Real McCoys, Adam-12, Dragnet, The Patty Duke Show, My Three Sons, and Gunsmoke. She played Wilma Clemson on the television series Date with the Angels, and played the title role in the radio series Candy Matson. She was married to actor Monty Masters, who also created Candy Matson.

References 

20th-century American actresses
American television actresses
1915 births
1986 deaths